Anna Yuriyivna Nahirna (born 30 September 1988) is a Ukrainian road and track cyclist, who currently rides for UCI Women's Continental Team . She participated at the 2012 UCI Road World Championships.

Major results

Track

2008
National Track Championships
1st  Points Race
3rd Individual Pursuit

2013
Copa Internacional de Pista
1st Team Pursuit (with Olena Demydova and Hanna Solovey)
2nd Individual Pursuit
2nd Points Race, Grand Prix of Poland
2nd Omnium, National Track Championships
7th Individual Pursuit, UCI Track Cycling World Championships

2015
National Track Championships
3rd Points Race
3rd Individual Pursuit

2016
National Track Championships
1st  Team Pursuit
2nd Omnium
2nd Points Race, Grand Prix Galichyna

2017
National Track Championships
1st  Individual Pursuit
1st  Team Pursuit
2nd Madison
3rd Points race, Grand Prix Minsk

2018
National Track Championships
1st  Individual Pursuit
1st  Madison
1st  Omnium
1st  Points Race
1st  Team Pursuit

2019
1st  Individual Pursuit, National Track Championships

Road
2012
1st  Time Trial, National Road Championships

2013
3rd Road Race, National Road Championships

2020 
1st  Road Race, National Road Championships
3rd GP Alanya

References

External links
 

Ukrainian female cyclists
Living people
Sportspeople from Lviv
1988 births
Cyclists at the 2019 European Games
European Games competitors for Ukraine
21st-century Ukrainian women